Software engineers form part of the workforce around the world. There are an estimated 26.9 million professional software engineers in the world as of 2022, up from 21 million in 2016.

By Country

United States 
There are an estimated 4.4 million professional software engineers in the US, up from an estimated 3.87 million out of a total employed workforce of 152 million (2.54%) in 2016.

Summary 

Based on data from the U.S. Bureau of Labor Statistics from 2002, about 612,000 software engineers worked in the U.S.  about one out of every 200 workers. There were 55% to 60% as many software engineers as all traditional engineers. This comparison holds whether one compares the number of practitioners, managers, educators, or technicians/programmers. Software engineering had 612,000 practitioners; 264,790 managers, 16,495 educators, and 457,320 programmers.

Software Engineers Versus Traditional Engineers 
The following two tables compare the number of software engineers (611,900 in 2002), versus the number of traditional engineers(1,157,020 in 2002).

There are another 1,500,000 people in system analysis, system administration, and computer support, many of whom might be called software engineers. Many systems analysts manage software development teams and analysis is an important software engineering role, so many of them might be considered software engineers in the near future. This means that the number of software engineers may actually be much higher.

Note also that the number of software engineers declined by 5% to 10% from 2000 to 2002.

Computer Managers Versus Construction and Engineering Managers 
Computer and information system managers (264,790) manage software projects, as well as computer operations. Similarly, Construction and engineering managers (413,750) oversee engineering projects, manufacturing plants, and construction sites. Computer management is 64% the size of construction and engineering management.

Software Engineering Educators Versus Engineering Educators 

Until now, computer science has been the main degree to acquire, whether for making software systems (software engineering) or studying the theoretical and mathematical facts of software systems (computer science). The data shows that the number of chemistry and physics educators (29,610) nearly equals the number of engineering educators (29,310). This means that software engineering education is 56% the size of traditional engineering education. Computer science is larger than software engineering, and larger than physics and chemistry.

Other Software and Engineering Roles

Relation to IT demographics 
Software engineers are part of the much larger software, hardware, application, and operations community. In 2000 in the U.S., there were about 680,000 software engineers and about 10,000,000 IT workers.

There are no numbers on testers in the BLS data.

India 
There has been a healthy growth in the number of India's IT professionals over the past few years. From a base of 6,800 knowledge workers in 198586, the number increased to 522,000 software and services professionals by the end of 200102. It is estimated that out of these 528,000 knowledge workers, almost 170,000 are working in the IT software and services export industry; nearly 106,000 are working in the IT enabled services and over 230,000 in user organizations.

References

See also 
 Software engineering
 List of software engineering topics
 Software engineering economics
 Software engineering professionalism

Software engineering
Demographics